Burnmoor may refer to:
Bournmoor, a village in County Durham, England, previously known as Burnmoor
Burnmoor, Cumbria, area near Eskdale in Cumbria, England
Burnmoor stone circles above Eskdale in Cumbria, England
Burnmoor Tarn above Eskdale
Burn Moor, hill near Duddon Valley in Cumbria, England